William T. Lewis (né Willie Meria Tawlton Lewis; 10 June 1905 – 13 January 1971) was an American jazz clarinetist and bandleader.

Career 
Lewis was born Cleburne, Texas, United States. He grew up in Dallas and played in variety shows as a teen. He attended the New England Conservatory of Music, then played in Will Marion Cook's orchestra. When Cook's band was taken over by Sam Wooding, Lewis traveled with him on his tours of Europe, South America, and North Africa, remaining until Wooding disbanded the orchestra in 1931.

Following this Lewis set up his own band, Willie Lewis and His Entertainers, which featured some of Wooding's old players and played to great success in Europe. Among those who played under Lewis were Herman Chittison, Benny Carter, Bill Coleman, Garnet Clark, Bobby Martin, and June Cole. Lewis's Entertainers recorded for French label Disques Swing.

In 1941, Lewis disbanded the Entertainers and returned to New York City. He played sparsely after this; he found some work as an actor, but took up bartending as his fortunes declined. He died in New York City, aged 65.

References
General

<li> [ Willie Lewis] at AllMusic

Inline

1905 births
1971 deaths
People from Cleburne, Texas
American jazz clarinetists
American jazz bandleaders
20th-century American musicians
Jazz musicians from Texas